A. Raja is an Indian politician serving as the MLA of Devikulam Constituency since May 2021.

A. Raja was born on October 17, 1986 to Anthony Lakshmanan and Easwary, who were plantation workers.

He is an advocate by profession, practicing in Munsiff Court, Devikulam since 2009. 
He finished his LLB from Govt. Law College, Coimbatore.

Raja defeated D. Kumar of UDF by 7848 votes in the Kerala Legislative Assembly Election, 2021.

He erred in taking oath as Member of Legislative Assembly and was fined Rs 2,500.

References 

Kerala MLAs 2021–2026
Communist Party of India (Marxist) politicians from Kerala
1986 births
Living people